Alexander McClure (3 April 1892 – 2 October 1971) was an English professional footballer who played as a centre half. He played for Birmingham both before and after the First World War, making 198 appearances in all competitions, and helped them win the championship of the Second Division in 1920–21. He also played in the Football League for Aston Villa, Stoke, Coventry City and Walsall.

Career
McClure was born in Workington, Cumberland, on 3 April 1892. He was a powerful player with good positional ability, who captained Birmingham's reserve team before establishing himself as club captain and linchpin of the first team's defence. He played for the Football League XI in 1921–22 against the Irish Football League. After leaving Birmingham he went on to play for four other Midlands teams, Aston Villa, Stoke, Coventry City and Walsall. On retiring from playing he worked for short periods as trainer at various clubs, including as trainer of Birmingham's juniors, and in 1932 he was appointed assistant manager of the club under Leslie Knighton and later under George Liddell.

During the First World War McClure served in the Royal Navy and was involved in the Zeebrugge Raid. After leaving football he worked for Rudge motorcycles and went on to run a successful haulage business in Small Heath, Birmingham. The 1939 Register finds him living with his wife, Amy, in Kenelm Road, Small Heath, and engaged in war work, collecting scrap metal from factories. He was still resident at that address at the time of his death in Birmingham on 2 October 1971 at the age of 79. A nephew, Joe McClure, also became a professional footballer.

Career statistics
Source:

References

1892 births
Sportspeople from Workington
1971 deaths
English footballers
Association football central defenders
Birmingham City F.C. players
Aston Villa F.C. players
Stoke City F.C. players
Coventry City F.C. players
Walsall F.C. players
English Football League players
English Football League representative players
Royal Navy personnel of World War I
Footballers from Cumbria